Encyclopedia of White Power: A Sourcebook on the Radical Racist Right is a reference book edited by Jeffrey Kaplan.  It focuses on the White Power movement, mainly United States groups and individuals (with a few Norwegian and Swedish groups and individuals also included).

In addition to contributions by academics, it includes entries by far-right-wing people, as well as a section of primary sources.  Kaplan's criteria for inclusion was that "the movements and individuals should be (i) strongly racialist, (ii) revolutionary, and (iii) have a strong religious streak."  He approached contributors with the requirement that the authors "write an entry that would 'neither demonize nor proselytize, but would leave an accurate and unbiased historical record.'"  It contains analysis of the organizations and philosophies in the white power movement and the inter-relationships that exist between the movement's leaders and groups. It was published by Altamira Press, a division of Rowman & Littlefield Publishers, Inc., as a 585-page hardcover in 2000.

Quotation

External links
Encyclopedia of White Power, reviewed by Cas Mudde (University of Edinburgh) for e-Extreme: Electronic Newsletter of the ECPR-SG on Extremism & Democracy, Vol. 2, No. 1, Spring 2001. 
Encyclopedia of White Power Limited Preview

2000 non-fiction books
White Power
Books about the far right
Books by Jeffrey Kaplan
Works about white nationalism